Super-K is the Super-Kamiokande neutrino observatory located under Mount Kamioka, Japan.

Super K or Super-K may also refer to:

 Super K Productions, a 1960s American recording production company
 Super K – The Movie, a 2011 Indian animated film
 Superdollar, known as "Super K" in Japan
 Roger Clemens, a professional baseball player referred to by that nickname on the 1987 Fleer baseball card "Dr. K and Super K."

See also
K Supercomputer, Japanese supercomputer